Derby Midland F.C. were an English football club, in existence from 1881 until 1891. However, the first known match played by Derby Midland Club was a game of 15 each side against Wirksworth Football Club in 1873.

The club were founder members of the Midland Football League in 1889. They finished second in 1889–90 and fourth in 1890–91. In the FA Cup, they progressed to the third round in 1883–84 and the second round in 1889–90. In 1891, the club merged with Derby County, who were playing in the Football League.

References

Derby County F.C.
Association football clubs established in 1881
Association football clubs disestablished in 1891
Sport in Derby
History of Derby
1881 establishments in England
1891 disestablishments in England
Defunct football clubs in Derbyshire
Defunct football clubs in England
Railway association football teams in England